Hardee T. Lineham is a Canadian actor. He is most noted for his performance in the 1996 film Shoemaker, for which he was a Genie Award nominee for Best Supporting Actor at the 18th Genie Awards in 1997.

Most prominently a stage actor, he won the Dora Mavor Moore Award for Best Leading Actor (General Theatre) in 1993 for Canadian Stage's production of Richard III. He was previously nominated in the same category in 1981 for The Crackwalker. His other stage roles have included Sean Harris in the original Factory Theatre production of George F. Walker's Love and Anger, and Daniel Jackman in the original Grand Theatre production of Timothy Findley's The Stillborn Lover.

He has also appeared in the films Wild Horse Hank, The Wars and Pale Saints, and had a regular television role as Carey in The Jane Show.

References

External links

20th-century Canadian male actors
21st-century Canadian male actors
Canadian male film actors
Canadian male stage actors
Canadian male television actors
Canadian male Shakespearean actors
Living people
Year of birth missing (living people)